Red River Presbyterian Meetinghouse Site and Cemetery is a historic Presbyterian church building in Adairville, Kentucky.

It was started in 1800 and was added to the National Register of Historic Places in 1976.

References

Presbyterian churches in Kentucky
Protestant Reformed cemeteries
Churches on the National Register of Historic Places in Kentucky
Religious buildings and structures completed in 1800
Churches in Logan County, Kentucky
National Register of Historic Places in Logan County, Kentucky
Cemeteries on the National Register of Historic Places in Kentucky
Presbyterian cemeteries in the United States